Carolina Henriette MacGillavry (22 January 1904 in Amsterdam – 9 May 1993 in Amsterdam) was a Dutch chemist and crystallographer. She is known for her discoveries on the use of diffraction in crystallography.

Biography
MacGillavry (nicknamed "Mac") was born the second of six children in an intellectual family (her father was a brain surgeon, her mother a teacher).

Education 
In 1921, MacGillavry began a study in chemistry at the University of Amsterdam, graduating in 1925, having become interested in the (then) new field of quantum mechanics. In 1928, she gave "a very topical" presentation on quantum mechanical calculations on the hydrogen molecule.

She finished her Master's degree cum laude on 16 March 1932, and continued her work as assistant of chemist A. Smits. She became a friend of J. M. Bijvoet, who interested her in crystallography which led to her 1937 PhD thesis on the subject, which she completed cum laude with Prof. AHW Aten on 27 January 1937. She then became assistant of A. E. van Arkel at Leiden, but Bijvoet asked her to come back to the Amsterdam crystallography laboratory that same year. Together with Bijvoet she researched electromagnetic diffraction and its use in crystallography. She also did research in inorganic chemistry.

Crystallography 

After World War II, MacGillavry was one of the developers of direct methods, an innovative calculus that could be used in crystallography. The method uses the Harker–Kasper inequality, that was first published in 1948 by crystallographers D. Harker and J. S. Kasper. Due to her work on Harker–Kasper inequalities, she became an international authority on the subject and co-authored the standard text about it in the Netherlands.  

In 1948 she worked with R. Pepinsky in Auburn, Alabama, for a year. The Dutch company Philips also grew interested in her work on the chemistry of solids. 

In 1950 she became the first woman to be appointed to the Royal Netherlands Academy of Arts and Sciences. In the same year she became a professor at the University of Amsterdam and she retired in 1972.

In 1986, In the English-speaking world MacGillavry became famous for her book Symmetry aspects of M. C. Escher's periodic drawings on the works of the Dutch graphic artist M. C. Escher. The book was instrumental in drawing international attention to the artist.

Personal life 
MacGillavry married the oto-rhino-laryngologist J. H. Nieuwenhuijsen in 1968. 

She died 9 May 1993 in Amsterdam and is buried in Utrecht.

A street in Watergraafsmeer, the Netherlands, is named in her honor.

References

1904 births
1993 deaths
Crystallographers
20th-century Dutch chemists
Dutch women chemists
Members of the Royal Netherlands Academy of Arts and Sciences
Scientists from Amsterdam
University of Amsterdam alumni
Academic staff of the University of Amsterdam